Marty Dallman (born February 15, 1963) is a Canadian-born Austrian former professional ice hockey player.

Career 
Dallman played six games in the National Hockey League (NHL) for the Toronto Maple Leafs during the 1987–88 and 1988–89 seasons. Most of his career, which lasted from 1984 to 1999, was spent in the Austrian Hockey League and other European and minor leagues. Internationally he played for the Austrian national team at the 1994 Winter Olympics in Lillehammer.

Personal life 
Dallman is the uncle of Kevin Dallman, who also played in the NHL and then in the Kontinental Hockey League.

Career statistics

Regular season and playoffs

International

Awards and honors

References

External links
 

1963 births
Living people
Abilene Aviators players
Austrian ice hockey players
Baltimore Skipjacks players
Canadian ice hockey centres
Canadian expatriate ice hockey players in England
Canadian expatriate ice hockey players in Austria
Canadian expatriate ice hockey players in Switzerland
EC Graz players
HC Fribourg-Gottéron players
Ice hockey people from Ontario
Ice hockey players at the 1994 Winter Olympics
Los Angeles Kings draft picks
New Haven Nighthawks players
Newmarket Saints players
Niagara Falls Flyers players
Nottingham Panthers players
Olympic ice hockey players of Austria
RPI Engineers men's ice hockey players
South Carolina Stingrays players
Sportspeople from Niagara Falls, Ontario
Toronto Maple Leafs players